Endre Süli  (also, Endre Suli or Endre Šili) is a mathematician. He is Professor of Numerical Analysis in the Mathematical Institute, University of Oxford, Fellow and Tutor in Mathematics at Worcester College, Oxford and Adjunct Fellow of Linacre College, Oxford. He was educated at the University of Belgrade and, as a British Council Visiting Student, at the University of Reading and St Catherine's College, Oxford. His research is concerned with the mathematical analysis of numerical algorithms for nonlinear partial differential equations.

Biography
Süli is a Foreign Member of the Serbian Academy of Sciences and Arts (2009), Fellow of the European Academy of Sciences (FEurASc, 2010), Fellow of the Society for Industrial and Applied Mathematics (FSIAM, 2016), a Member of the Academia Europaea (MAE, 2020), and a Fellow of the Royal Society (FRS, 2021). He was an invited speaker at the International Congress of Mathematicians in Madrid in 2006 and was Chair of the Society for the Foundations of Computational Mathematics
(2002–2005). Other honours include: Fellow of the Institute of Mathematics and its Applications (FIMA, 2007), Charlemagne Distinguished Lecture (2011), IMA Service Award (2011), Professor Hospitus Universitatis Carolinae Pragensis, Charles University in Prague (2012–), Distinguished Visiting Chair Professor Shanghai Jiao Tong University (2013), President, SIAM United Kingdom and Republic of Ireland Section (2013–2015), London Mathematical Society/New Zealand Mathematical Society Forder Lectureship (2015), Aziz Lecture (2015), BIMOS Distinguished Lecture (2016), John von Neumann Lecture (2016), Sibe Mardešić Lecture (2018), London Mathematical Society Naylor Prize and Lectureship (2021). Since 2005 Süli has been co-Editor-in-Chief of the IMA Journal of Numerical Analysis published by Oxford University Press. He is a member of the Scientific Advisory Board of the Berlin Mathematics Research Center MATH+ and the Board of the Doctoral School for Mathematical and Physical Sciences for Advanced Materials and Technologies of the Scuola Superiore Meridionale at the University of Naples, and was a member of the Scientific Steering Committee of the Isaac Newton Institute for Mathematical Sciences at the University of Cambridge (2011–2014), the Scientific Advisory Board of the Berlin Mathematical School (2016–2018), the Scientific Council of Société de Mathématiques Appliquées et Industrielles (SMAI) (2014–2020), the Scientific Committee of the Mathematisches Forschungsinstitut Oberwolfach (Mathematical Research Institute of Oberwolfach) (2013–2021), and the Scientific Advisory Board of the Archimedes Center for Modeling, Analysis and Computation at the University of Crete (2010–2014). Between 2014 and 2022 he served as the Delegate for Mathematics to the Board of Delegates of Oxford University Press.

He grew up in Subotica and is a recipient of the Pro Urbe Prize of the City of Subotica (2021). He is the father of Sterija Award-winning Serbian playwright and dramatist Fedor Süli (also, Fedor Šili).

Notes

External links
Endre Süli's official home page at the University of Oxford

Numerical analysts
Yugoslav emigrants to the United Kingdom
Serbian mathematicians
Members of the Serbian Academy of Sciences and Arts
20th-century British mathematicians
20th-century Hungarian mathematicians
21st-century British mathematicians
21st-century Hungarian mathematicians
Oxford University Press Delegate
Fellows of Worcester College, Oxford
Fellows of Linacre College, Oxford
Alumni of St Catherine's College, Oxford
University of Belgrade Faculty of Mathematics alumni
1956 births
Fellows of the Society for Industrial and Applied Mathematics
Members of Academia Europaea
Fellows of the Royal Society
Living people